Ken Robinson (born 1942) is a former Ulster Unionist Party (UUP) politician who was a Member of the Northern Ireland Assembly (MLA) for East Antrim from 1998 to 2011.

Education
He was educated at Ballyclare High School, Queen's University, Belfast and Stranmillis College. Before entering politics, he was Head of Cavehill Primary School.

Political career
Robinson is a former Newtownabbey Borough Councillor (1985–1993 and 1995–1997). He has served as both Mayor (1991–1992) and Deputy-Mayor, and was Vice Chair of the Economic Development Committee (1995–1998).

He was first elected an MLA  in 1998, and re-elected in 2003 and 2007.

He was a member of the Committee of the Centre and the Education Committee in the 1998–2003 Assembly.
Robinson was a member of the Committee for Culture, Arts and Leisure and the Committee on Procedures until his retirement from Stormont in March 2011.  This followed on from his announcement in September 2010 that he was not seeking re-selection from the Ulster Unionist East Antrim Constituency Association.

On 20 September 2010, he announced his retirement from the Assembly, telling his constituency association in East Antrim that he would not be putting his name forward for next years assembly elections.

References

External links
 UUP website
 Stratagem profile
  Ken Robinson website

1942 births
Living people
People from County Antrim
Ulster Unionist Party MLAs
Northern Ireland MLAs 1998–2003
Northern Ireland MLAs 2003–2007
Northern Ireland MLAs 2007–2011
Members of Newtownabbey Borough Council
Place of birth missing (living people)
People educated at Ballyclare High School
Alumni of Stranmillis University College
Mayors of Newtownabbey